The Loeriesfontein Wind Energy Facility  is a wind farm in the Hantam Municipality, located near Loeriesfontein, in the Northern Cape province of South Africa. Construction began in September 2015 and all the turbines were in place by 28 February 2017. The 140MW Loeriesfontein Wind Farm has a capacity of 535,354 MWh/year.

References

Wind farms in South Africa
Economy of the Northern Cape